Dorte Dalum Jensen (born 3 July 1978) is a Danish former football defender. She played for Norwegian Toppserien club LSK Kvinner. She won over 40 caps for the Denmark national team.

Club career
In January 2008, Dalum Jensen left Swedish Damallsvenskan contenders Djurgården/Älvsjö to sign for Olympique Lyonnais. In summer 2009, she returned to Norwegian football, where she had previously played for IF Liungen and Asker SK. This time her destination was Team Strømmen, who became LSK Kvinner for the 2010 season. Dalum Jensen suffered a damaged cruciate ligament in January 2011.

Although Jensen's parents and two elder brothers had no interest in football, she began to play at school, aged 10. Her early career took in local club Hadsund Boldklub, Vorup FB, and then Hjortshøj Egå Idrætsforening (HEI) before she left for Norway.

National career
She represented Denmark at the UEFA European Championship 2005 and was named in the squad for the 2007 FIFA World Cup in China.

Dalum Jensen won 14 caps and scored two goals for the Denmark under-21 team, making her senior debut against Netherlands in September 1999. She scored a single goal for the national team, in a 3–2 friendly defeat by France in September 2004. She won the last of 41 caps in August 2007, in a World Cup warm-up friendly defeat by Sweden in Farum.

Personal life
Dalum Jensen's partner is the Norwegian goalkeeper Bente Nordby, whom she played alongside at Asker, Djurgårdens, and Lyon.

References

External links
Danish Football Union (DBU) statistics 
Profile at the LSK Kvinner site 
Profile at Footofeminin.fr 

1978 births
Living people
Danish women's footballers
Expatriate women's footballers in Norway
Expatriate women's footballers in Sweden
Expatriate women's footballers in France
Denmark women's international footballers
Danish expatriate men's footballers
Danish expatriate sportspeople in Sweden
Danish expatriate sportspeople in Norway
Danish expatriate sportspeople in France
Asker Fotball (women) players
Djurgårdens IF Fotboll (women) players
Olympique Lyonnais Féminin players
LSK Kvinner FK players
Lesbian sportswomen
LGBT association football players
Danish LGBT sportspeople
Danish lesbians
People from Hadsund
Women's association football fullbacks
2007 FIFA Women's World Cup players
Division 1 Féminine players
Damallsvenskan players
21st-century Danish LGBT people
Sportspeople from the North Jutland Region
Denmark international footballers
Association football defenders